The 1941 South Dakota Coyotes football team was an American football team that represented the University of South Dakota in the North Central Conference (NCC) during the 1941 college football season. In its eighth season under head coach Harry Gamage, the team compiled a 6–2 record (4–1 against NCC opponents), finished second in the conference, and outscored opponents by a total of 159 to 66.

The team played its home games at Inman Field in Vermillion, South Dakota.

Four South Dakota players were selected by the college sports editors to the 1941 All-North Central Conference football team: end Ole Solberg, tackle Ed Petranek, quarterback Bob Burns, and fullback Don Forney.

Schedule

References

South Dakota
South Dakota Coyotes football seasons
South Dakota Coyotes football